Tenth of Tevet (Asarah BeTevet), the tenth day of the Hebrew month of Tevet, is a fast day in Judaism.  It is one of the minor fasts observed from before dawn to nightfall.  The fasting is in mourning of the siege of Jerusalem by Nebuchadnezzar II of Babylonia—an event that began on that date and ultimately culminated in the destruction of Solomon's Temple (the First Temple), downfall of the Kingdom of Judah, and the Babylonian exile of the Jewish people.

The fast day is not related to Hanukkah but happens to follow that festival by a week.  Whether the 10th of Tevet occurs 7 or 8 days after the last day of Hanukkah depends on whether the preceding Hebrew month of Kislev has 29 or 30 days in the relevant year.

History

According to II Kings, on the 10th day of the 10th month (Tevet), in the ninth year of Zedekiah's reign (588 BCE), Nebuchadnezzar, the Babylonian king, began the siege of Jerusalem. Eighteen months later, on the 17th of Tammuz at the end of the eleventh year of Zedekiah's reign (586 BCE), he broke through the city walls, later the Romans would similarly break through the walls of Jerusalem on the 17th of Tammuz. The siege ended with the destruction of the Temple three weeks later, on the 9th of Av (Tisha B'Av), the end of the first Kingdoms and the elite of Judah taken in exile to Babylon. The tenth of Tevet is part of the cycle of three fasts connected with these events.

The first reference to the Tenth of Tevet as a fast appears in Zechariah 8, where it is called the "fast of the tenth month."  One opinion in the Talmud  states that the "fast of the tenth month" refers to the fifth of Tevet, when, according to Ezekiel, news of the destruction of the Temple reached those already in exile in Babylon. However, the tenth is the date observed today, according to the other opinion presented in the Talmud. Other references to the fast and the affliction can be found in the books of Ezekiel (the siege) and Jeremiah.

According to tradition, as described by the liturgy for the day's selichot, the fast also commemorates other calamities that occurred throughout Jewish history on the tenth of Tevet and the two days preceding it:
 On the eighth of Tevet one year during the 3rd century BCE, a time of Hellenistic rule of Judea during the Second Temple period, Ptolemy, King of Egypt, ordered the translation of the Hebrew Bible into Greek, a work which later became known as the Septuagint. Seventy two sages were placed in solitary confinement and ordered to translate the Torah into Greek. Judaism sees this event as a tragedy, as it reflected a deprivation and debasement of the divine nature of the Torah, and a subversion of its spiritual and literary qualities. They reasoned that upon translation from the original Hebrew, the Torah's legal codes and deeper layers of meaning would be lost. Many Jewish laws are formulated in terms of specific Hebrew words employed in the Torah; without the original Hebrew wording, the authenticity and essence of the legal system would be damaged. The mystical ideas contained in the Torah are also drawn from the original Hebrew. As such, these would not be accessed by individuals studying the Torah in Greek (or any other language) alone.
 On the ninth of Tevet, "something happened, but we do not know what it was..." (Shulchan Aruch). The selichot liturgy for the day states that Ezra the Scribe, the great leader who brought some Jews back to the Holy Land from the Babylonian exile and who ushered in the era of the Second Temple, died on this day, and this is verified by the Kol Bo. But according to the earlier sources (the Geonim as recorded by Bahag and cited in Tur Orach Chaim 580), the specific tragedy of 9 Tevet is unknown. Some manuscripts of Bahag (not those available to the Tur) add that Ezra and Nechemiah died on this day—but only after first stating that the Rabbis have given no reason for why the day is tragic. Other suggestions are given as to why the ninth of Tevet is notable as well.

Observance
As with all minor Jewish fast days, the Tenth of Tevet begins at dawn and concludes at nightfall. In accordance with the general rules of minor fasts as set forth in the Shulchan Aruch, and in contrast to Tisha B'Av, there are no additional physical constraints beyond fasting (such as the prohibitions against bathing or of wearing leather shoes).  Because it is a minor fast day, halacha exempts from fasting those who are ill, even if their illnesses are not life-threatening, and pregnant and nursing women who find fasting difficult.  The Mishnah Berurah notes that it is still commendable to observe all the restrictions of Tisha B'Av on the minor fast days (except the restriction of wearing leather shoes).  Even so, it says, one should not refrain from bathing in preparation for Shabbat when the Tenth of Tevet falls on a Friday.

A Torah reading, the Aneinu prayer in the Amidah, and the Avinu Malkeinu prayer are added at both shacharit and mincha services in many communities, unless the fast falls on Friday, when Tachanun and Avinu Malkeinu are not said at mincha. At shacharit services, Selichot are also said, and at mincha, in Ashkenazic congregations, the Haftarah is read.

The Tenth of Tevet is the only minor fast day that can coincide with Friday in the current Jewish calendar. When it does, the unusual event of a Torah and Haftarah reading at the mincha service right before Shabbat takes place.  This is fairly rare; the most recent occurrence was in 2020, while the next will happen in (December of, as opposed to The first time it occurs in January of) 2023 . If it falls on Friday, the fast must be observed until nightfall, even though Shabbat begins before sunset (up to 72 minutes earlier, depending on the halachic authority), and even though this requires one to enter Shabbat hungry from the fast, something typically avoided. It cannot be determined for sure whether other fasts would have the same ruling, because no other fast day can fall out on Friday.

Although this fast is considered a minor fast, the Abudirham attributed to it an additional theoretical stringency not shared by any other fast except Yom Kippur, namely that if the Tenth of Tevet were to fall out on a Shabbat, this fast would actually be observed on Shabbat.  (This cannot happen under the current arrangement of the Hebrew calendar.) The reason the fasts of the Tenth of Tevet and Yom Kippur must be observed on the actual day on which they occur is because of the phrase "the very day" is used in reference to both of them, in Ezekiel 24:2 in reference to the Tenth of Tevet, and similarly for Yom Kippur in Leviticus 23:28. This view is rejected by the Beit Yosef and all other major halakhic authorities, but was popularized by Rabbi Moses Sofer, who wrote a commentary based on the philosophy behind this view.

Although the Tenth of Tevet is an annual observance on the Jewish calendar, its placement around the end of the Gregorian calendar year means that in some Gregorian years, there is no observance of the fast, while in other years, the fast is observed twice. Thus, the Tenth of Tevet did not occur at all in 2019. Instead, the "2019" observance of the fast took place in January 2020, while the subsequent observance occurred in December 2020.

Day of general kaddish
The Chief Rabbinate of Israel chose to observe the Tenth of Tevet as a "general kaddish day" (yom hakaddish ha'klalli) to allow the relatives of victims of the Holocaust, and whose yahrtzeits (anniversaries of their deaths) is unknown, to observe the traditional yahrtzeit practices for the deceased, including lighting a memorial candle, learning mishnayot and reciting the kaddish. According to the policy of the Chief Rabbinate in Israel, the memorial prayer is also recited in synagogues, after the reading of the Torah at the morning services. To some religious Jews, this day is preferable as a remembrance day to Yom HaShoah, since the latter occurs in the month of Nisan, in which mourning is traditionally prohibited.

See also
Fast of Gedalia
Fast of Esther
Fast of Seventeenth of Tammuz
Fast of Tisha B'Av

Notes

References

External links
Rabbi Eliezer Melamed – Peninei Halakha – The Laws of the Tenth of Tevet
Tenth of Teves – Mrs. Shira Smiles talks about the fast day of the Tenth of Tevet 
Tenth of Teves – Rav Reichman gives you the Hasidic side of the fast 
Tenth of Tevet – Insights to the day

Tevet 10
Jewish fast days
Solomon's Temple
Tevet observances